Town Line is a hamlet and census-designated place (CDP) in Erie County, New York, United States. The population was 2,367 at the 2010 census. It is part of the Buffalo–Niagara Falls Metropolitan Statistical Area. The community is located on the boundary between the towns of Lancaster and Alden. Town Line is notable for having held a nonbinding vote to secede from the United States in 1861, and for having held a ceremonial vote to rejoin the United States in 1946.

Demographics

History 
According to Town Line oral lore, in 1861, 125 men gathered in an informal meeting at a local schoolhouse and passed (85 to 40) a resolution to secede from the United States. Because Town Line was never an incorporated municipal entity in the first place and had no well-defined boundaries, the resolution had no legal effect; neither the Confederacy nor the Union ever formally recognized the action. Alden Historical Society archivist Karen Muchow has stated that there are no written records of the action. According to Muchow, several members of the German-American community fled to Canada and twenty residents fought for the Union Army. While the reason behind the vote is unknown, author Daren Wang and others have opined that Town Line residents—some of whom had emigrated from Germany to avoid conscription—were motivated by opposition to a potential military draft being necessitated by the Civil War.

Town Line held a ceremony on January 24, 1946 to "rejoin" the Union. Hollywood celebrity Cesar Romero participated in the festivities. On that day, residents voted, 90 to 23, to rescind the 19th-century secession vote.

Geography and demographics
Town Line is located at  (42.884974, -78.558428).

As of the census of 2000, there were 2,521 people, 906 households, and 759 families residing in the CDP.

See also
Dade County, Georgia - voted to secede (unrecognized) from the state of Georgia, and from the United States, rejoined in 1945.

References

Buffalo–Niagara Falls metropolitan area
Census-designated places in Erie County, New York
Census-designated places in New York (state)
Secession crisis of 1860–61